Hudson Swafford (born September 9, 1987) is an American professional golfer. He formerly played on the PGA Tour, where he won three tournaments, until June 2022, when he joined LIV Golf.

Early life and amateur career
Swafford was born in Tallahassee, Florida. He played his college golf at the University of Georgia.

Professional career
Swafford turned professional after graduating in 2011. He joined the Nationwide Tour in 2012 and picked up his first victory at the Stadion Classic at UGA on May 6, shooting a course record 62 in the final round. Swafford trailed Luke List by a stroke heading to the final hole of the tournament, but he holed out his bunker shot for a birdie while List bogeyed to give him the victory. Swafford was familiar with the course as it is his former college course.  Swafford is a member of the Gridiron Secret Society.

Swafford played in the Web.com Tour Finals in 2013 and finished 21st to earn his PGA Tour card for 2014.

On January 22, 2017, Swafford recorded his first PGA Tour victory at the CareerBuilder Challenge. On September 27, 2020, Swafford won the Corales Puntacana Resort and Club Championship. He was playing with a Major Medical Extension after a rib injury and foot surgery.

On January 23, 2022, Swafford won the American Express in La Quinta, California for his third career PGA Tour win.

Swafford took part in the inaugural LIV Golf event at Centurion Club near London, with his PGA Tour membership being indefinitely suspended. He has yet to record a top-25 on the LIV Golf Series.

Personal
Hudson is the son of David and Jean Swafford. He graduated from Maclay School in Tallahassee, Florida before matriculating to the University of Georgia, where he received a B.S. in Consumer Economics. He is married to Katherine Wainwright Brandon.

Amateur wins
2006 Dogwood Invitational

Professional wins (4)

PGA Tour wins (3)

Web.com Tour wins (1)

Results in major championships
Results not in chronological order in 2020.

CUT = missed the half-way cut
"T" = tied
NT = No tournament due to COVID-19 pandemic

Results in The Players Championship

CUT = missed the halfway cut
"T" indicates a tie for a place
C = Canceled after the first round due to the COVID-19 pandemic

Results in World Golf Championships

"T" = tied

See also
2013 Web.com Tour Finals graduates
2014 Web.com Tour Finals graduates

References

External links

Profile on Georgia's official athletic site

American male golfers
Georgia Bulldogs men's golfers
PGA Tour golfers
LIV Golf players
Korn Ferry Tour graduates
Golfers from Tallahassee, Florida
Sportspeople from Lakeland, Florida
1987 births
Living people